The 2003–04 NBA season was the 15th season for the Minnesota Timberwolves in the National Basketball Association. The season is one of the most memorable in Timberwolves history.  During the offseason, the Timberwolves acquired 4-time All-Star guard Latrell Sprewell. The arrival was seen as controversial as Sprewell was known for his choking incident with then-Warriors head coach P. J. Carlesimo, though also known for helping the 8th-seeded New York Knicks to  the NBA Finals in 1999. Sam Cassell, who was known for winning two championships with the Houston Rockets, and his tenure with the Milwaukee Bucks, where he helped guide the Bucks to the Eastern Conference Finals in 2001, also was acquired to join Garnett, forming a "Big 3". The Timberwolves also signed free agents Michael Olowakandi and Trenton Hassell. With a Western Conference-best 58-24 finish, the Wolves set the franchise record for wins, and won its first and only division championship. Power forward Kevin Garnett averaged 24.2 points, a league-high 13.9 rebounds, 5.0 assists, 1.5 steals and 2.2 blocks per game, winning the regular season Most Valuable Player Award.

In the first round of the playoffs, the Timberwolves defeated the Denver Nuggets in five games, which was their first ever win in a playoff series. The Wolves were then pushed to the limit in the semi-finals by the Sacramento Kings, who they narrowly defeated in a deciding seventh game. In the Western Conference Finals, they faced the Los Angeles Lakers, who had defeated them in last season's First Round in six games. The Lakers team, known for its all-star starting lineup of Shaquille O'Neal, Kobe Bryant, Gary Payton and Karl Malone, defeated the Wolves in six games, then would go on to lose in the NBA Finals to the Detroit Pistons in five games. Garnett, Cassell, and head coach Flip Saunders represented the Western Conference in the 2004 NBA All-Star Game. The 2004 All-Star Game was Cassell's only All-Star appearance in his career.

As of 2021, this remains the only season the Timberwolves have ever won a playoff series; Minnesota would not make the playoffs again until 2018, losing in the first round.

Offseason

NBA Draft

Roster

Regular season

Standings

Record vs. opponents

Playoffs

|- align="center" bgcolor="#ccffcc"
| 1
| April 18
| Denver
| W 106–92
| Sam Cassell (40)
| Kevin Garnett (20)
| Garnett, Sprewell (4)
| Target Center18,503
| 1–0
|- align="center" bgcolor="#ccffcc"
| 2
| April 21
| Denver
| W 95–81
| Latrell Sprewell (31)
| Kevin Garnett (22)
| Kevin Garnett (10)
| Target Center18,101
| 2–0
|- align="center" bgcolor="#ffcccc"
| 3
| April 24
| @ Denver
| L 86–107
| Latrell Sprewell (25)
| Kevin Garnett (11)
| Kevin Garnett (8)
| Pepsi Center19,713
| 2–1
|- align="center" bgcolor="#ccffcc"
| 4
| April 27
| @ Denver
| W 84–82
| Kevin Garnett (27)
| Kevin Garnett (14)
| Kevin Garnett (5)
| Pepsi Center19,694
| 3–1
|- align="center" bgcolor="#ccffcc"
| 5
| April 30
| Denver
| W 102–91
| Kevin Garnett (28)
| Garnett, Madsen (7)
| Kevin Garnett (8)
| Target Center19,890
| 4–1
|-

|- align="center" bgcolor="#ffcccc"
| 1
| May 4
| Sacramento
| L 98–104
| Sam Cassell (40)
| Kevin Garnett (18)
| Kevin Garnett (7)
| Target Center18,792
| 0–1
|- align="center" bgcolor="#ccffcc"
| 2
| May 8
| Sacramento
| W 94–89
| Kevin Garnett (28)
| Garnett, Johnson (11)
| Sam Cassell (7)
| Target Center19,599
| 1–1
|- align="center" bgcolor="#ccffcc"
| 3
| May 10
| @ Sacramento
| W 114–113 (OT)
| Kevin Garnett (30)
| Kevin Garnett (15)
| Latrell Sprewell (6)
| ARCO Arena17,317
| 2–1
|- align="center" bgcolor="#ffcccc"
| 4
| May 12
| @ Sacramento
| L 81–87
| Kevin Garnett (19)
| Kevin Garnett (21)
| Cassell, Garnett (6)
| ARCO Arena17,317
| 2–2
|- align="center" bgcolor="#ccffcc"
| 5
| May 14
| Sacramento
| W 86–74
| Latrell Sprewell (34)
| Mark Madsen (13)
| Sam Cassell (7)
| Target Center19,318
| 3–2
|- align="center" bgcolor="#ffcccc"
| 6
| May 16
| @ Sacramento
| L 87–104
| Latrell Sprewell (27)
| Kevin Garnett (10)
| Kevin Garnett (5)
| ARCO Arena17,317
| 3–3
|- align="center" bgcolor="#ccffcc"
| 7
| May 19
| Sacramento
| W 83–80
| Kevin Garnett (32)
| Kevin Garnett (21)
| Sam Cassell (7)
| Target Center19,944
| 4–3
|-

|- align="center" bgcolor="#ffcccc"
| 1
| May 21
| L.A. Lakers
| L 88–97
| Latrell Sprewell (23)
| Kevin Garnett (10)
| Sam Cassell (8)
| Target Center19,552
| 0–1
|- align="center" bgcolor="#ccffcc"
| 2
| May 23
| L.A. Lakers
| W 89–71
| Kevin Garnett (24)
| Kevin Garnett (11)
| Latrell Sprewell (8)
| Target Center19,707
| 1–1
|- align="center" bgcolor="#ffcccc"
| 3
| May 25
| @ L.A. Lakers
| L 89–100
| Kevin Garnett (22)
| Kevin Garnett (11)
| Kevin Garnett (7)
| Staples Center18,997
| 1–2
|- align="center" bgcolor="#ffcccc"
| 4
| May 27
| @ L.A. Lakers
| L 85–92
| Kevin Garnett (28)
| Kevin Garnett (13)
| Kevin Garnett (9)
| Staples Center18,997
| 1–3
|- align="center" bgcolor="#ccffcc"
| 5
| May 29
| L.A. Lakers
| W 98–96
| Kevin Garnett (30)
| Kevin Garnett (19)
| Latrell Sprewell (5)
| Target Center20,109
| 2–3
|- align="center" bgcolor="#ffcccc"
| 6
| May 31
| @ L.A. Lakers
| L 90–96
| Latrell Sprewell (27)
| Kevin Garnett (17)
| Sprewell, Martin (5)
| Staples Center18,997
| 2–4
|-

Awards and honors

Week/Month
 Kevin Garnett was named Western Conference Player of the Week for games played November 16 through November 22.
 Kevin Garnett was named Western Conference Player of the Week for games played December 14 through December 20.
 Sam Cassell was named Western Conference Player of the Week for games played December 21 through December 27.
 Kevin Garnett was named Western Conference Player of the Week for games played January 18 through January 24.
 Kevin Garnett was named Western Conference Player of the Week for games played January 25 through January 31.
 Kevin Garnett was named Western Conference Player of the Month for December.
 Kevin Garnett was named Western Conference Player of the Month for January.
 Kevin Garnett was named Western Conference Player of the Month for February.
 Kevin Garnett was named Western Conference Player of the Month for April.
 Flip Saunders was named Western Conference Coach of the Month for April.

All-Star
 Kevin Garnett was voted as a starter for the Western Conference in the All-Star Game. It was his seventh consecutive All-Star selection. Garnett finished first among Western Conference players in voting with 1,780,918 votes.
 Sam Cassell was selected as a reserve for the Western Conference in the All-Star Game. It was his first and only All-Star selection.
 Flip Saunders coached the Western Conference to a 136–132 victory over the Eastern Conference.

Season
 Kevin Garnett received the Most Valuable Player Award.
 Kevin Garnett was named to the All-NBA First Team. Garnett also finished sixth in Defensive Player of the Year voting.
 Sam Cassell was named to the All-NBA Second Team. Cassell also finished tenth in MVP voting.

Injuries/Missed games
 10/27/03: Troy Hudson: Sprained ankle; placed on injured list until December 20
 10/29/03: Wally Szczerbiak: Inflamed arch in foot; placed on injured reserve until February 19
 11/22/03: Michael Olowokandi: Knee tendinitis; out until November 28
 11/26/03: Mark Madsen: Back spasms; out until December 9
 12/05/03: Michael Olowokandi: Knee tendinitis; placed on injured list until February 20
 12/12/03: Mark Madsen: Back spasms; out until December 20
 12/20/03: Ervin Johnson: Personal reasons; did not play
 12/26/03: Troy Hudson: Sprained ankle; out until January 19
 01/10/04: Gary Trent: Sprained ankle; out until January 19
 01/23/04: Ervin Johnson: Personal reasons; did not play
 01/25/04: Ervin Johnson: Personal reasons; did not play
 02/01/04: Troy Hudson: Sprained ankle; out until February 17
 02/19/04: Ndudi Ebi: Knee tendinitis; placed on injured list for rest of season
 02/25/04: Sam Cassell: Ankle tendinitis; did not play
 02/27/04: Wally Szczerbiak: Flu; did not play
 03/21/04: Troy Hudson: Sore ankle; did not play
 03/23/04: Troy Hudson: Sore ankle; did not play
 03/31/04: Troy Hudson: Sprained ankle; placed on injured list for rest of season
 04/27/04: Wally Szczerbiak: Cracked vertebrae; out until May 14
 05/29/04: Sam Cassell: Back spasms; did not play
 05/31/04: Sam Cassell: Back spasms; did not play

Player statistics

Regular season

* – Stats with the Timberwolves.
^ – Minimum 125 free throws made.

Playoffs

† – Minimum 20 field goals made.
^ – Minimum 5 three-pointers made.

Transactions

Trades

Free agents

Additions

Subtractions

References

Minnesota Timberwolves seasons
2003 in sports in Minnesota
2004 in sports in Minnesota
Monnesota